The only AA I steam locomotive of the Royal Bavarian State Railways (Königlich Bayerische Staatsbahn) was built by the firm of Krauss in 1896. It had been designed by chief mechanical engineer, Richard von Helmholtz, as a 4-2-2-2 tender locomotive. The engine was largely based on the Bavarian B XI, but the driving and running gear was modified. The second coupled axle was replaced by a fixed carrying axle, and a dolly axle (Vorspannachse) added between the bogie and driving axle. This could be lowered by a pressure cylinder and was driven by an auxiliary engine with two cylinders. Despite her high maintenance requirement, she was economical to run due to her low steam consumption. In 1907 she was rebuilt after an accident into a 2'B h2 locomotive and redesignated as a Class P 2/4. She was taken over by the Deutsche Reichsbahn and run under operating number 36 861. She was the last Bavarian 4-4-0 locomotive to be retired in 1933.

The engine was equipped with a Bavarian 3 T 14.5 tender.

See also
 Royal Bavarian State Railways
 List of Bavarian locomotives and railbuses

References 

 
 

4-4-0 locomotives
AA I
Standard gauge locomotives of Germany
Krauss locomotives
Railway locomotives introduced in 1896
4-2-2-2 locomotives
2′B h2 locomotives
Passenger locomotives